Arnau Comas Freixas (born 11 April 2000) is a Spanish professional footballer who plays as a defender for Basel.

Career
Born in Cassà de la Selva, Girona, Catalonia, Comas started his career with Spanish La Liga side Barcelona. In 2019, he was sent on loan to Olot in the Spanish third tier.

Comas moved to Switzerland and joined FC Basel's first team for their 2022–23 season signing a four year contract, until summer 2026, under head coach Alexander Frei. On 21 July 2022, he debuted for his new team during a 2–0 win over Crusaders in the second qualifying round of the 2022–23 UEFA Europa Conference League. Three day later he played his domestic league debut for the club in the home game in the St. Jakob Stadium as Basel played a 1–1 draw against Servette.

References

External links 
 
 

2000 births
Living people
People from Gironès
Sportspeople from the Province of Girona
Spanish footballers
Footballers from Catalonia
Association football defenders
FC Barcelona Atlètic players
UE Olot players
FC Basel players
Primera Federación players
Segunda División B players
Spain under-21 international footballers
Expatriate footballers in Switzerland
Spanish expatriate sportspeople in Switzerland
Spanish expatriate footballers